Philippe Martin (born 26 January 1955) is a Belgian former racing driver. He competed in the 24 Hours of Le Mans between 1980 and 1985. He won the 24 Hours of Spa twice alongside his brother Jean-Michel. His nephew Maxime also won the race in 2016.

References

1955 births
Living people
Belgian racing drivers
24 Hours of Le Mans drivers
24 Hours of Spa drivers
World Sportscar Championship drivers
Racing drivers from Brussels

Team Joest drivers
20th-century Belgian people